Hardeep ("Harry") Jawanda (born in Wolverhampton, West Midlands) is an English international hockey player who plays as a Midfielder/forward. He belongs to Jawanda surname.

He joined Wolverhampton Hockey club, where he scored over 600 goals in his 5 seasons there. He then left Wolverhampton to join Cannock Hockey Club. With Cannock he won 5 National Titles and 2 European titles.

He then moved to Reading Hockey Club in the 2009/2010 transfer window due to work commitments.

References

Living people
English male field hockey players
British people of South Asian descent
Sportspeople from Wolverhampton
Cannock Hockey Club players
Reading Hockey Club players
Year of birth missing (living people)